Römerberg-Dudenhofen is a Verbandsgemeinde ("collective municipality") in the district Rhein-Pfalz-Kreis, in Rhineland-Palatinate, Germany. The seat of the Verbandsgemeinde is in Dudenhofen. It was formed on 1 July 2014 by the merger of the former Verbandsgemeinde Dudenhofen and the formerly independent municipality Römerberg.

The Verbandsgemeinde Römerberg-Dudenhofen consists of the following Ortsgemeinden ("local municipalities"):

Dudenhofen
Hanhofen
Harthausen
Römerberg

Verbandsgemeinde in Rhineland-Palatinate